Basel Mansurovich Abdoulfattakh (born 6 March 1990) is a Russian former professional association football player.

His father is of Syrian descent and his mother Russian.

Career
He made his Russian Premier League debut on 9 April 2011 for FC Krylia Sovetov Samara in a game against FC Lokomotiv Moscow.

On 30 June 2014, Abdoulfattakh signed long-term deal with Russian Football National League outfit Dynamo St. Petersburg.

He retired at the end of 2016 after failing to gain eligibility from FIFA to play for the Syria national football team.

References

External links
 
 

1990 births
Russian people of Syrian descent
Footballers from Saint Petersburg
Living people
Russian footballers
Russia under-21 international footballers
Association football defenders
FC Zenit Saint Petersburg players
PFC Krylia Sovetov Samara players
FC Yenisey Krasnoyarsk players
FC Chernomorets Novorossiysk players
FC Dynamo Saint Petersburg players
Al-Jaish Damascus players
Russian Premier League players
Russian First League players
Russian Second League players
Syrian Premier League players
Russian expatriate footballers
Expatriate footballers in Syria